Rajasthan Royals (RR) is a franchise cricket team based in Jaipur, India, which plays in the Indian Premier League (IPL). They were one of the eight teams that competed in the 2015 Indian Premier League. They were captained by Shane Watson. Rajasthan Royals finished 4th in the IPL and qualified for the champions league T20.

IPL

Standings
Rajasthan Royals finished 4th in the league stage of IPL 2015.

Match log

References

Rajasthan Royals seasons
2015 Indian Premier League